"A+E" is the debut single by British electronic group Clean Bandit, featuring vocals by Kandaka Moore and Nikki Cislyn. It was released on 7 December 2012 as the first single from their debut album, New Eyes. The song peaked at number 100 on the UK Singles Chart, but received mixed critical reception. The song's music video contains a CGI snake.

Background
The track was written by Jack Patterson while he was waiting for fellow band member Grace Chatto in the accident and emergency department of Whittington Hospital, North London. The track was originally released in 2012 as a double A-Side with "Nightingale". Both tracks feature Cislyn; only A&E features Moore. The album version of the song includes a string trio arrangement of Johann Sebastian Bach's St. Matthew Passion (BMV 244) Pt. 2, number 54 .

The track was recorded in Clean Bandit's studio in South Kilburn, London. Moore and Cislyn were recruited from a local community singing and dancing group next to South Kilburn Studios; the studios had a scheme in which artists could use the studios for free if a trainee was taken on.

Music video
The music video contains a CGI snake. Band member Jack Patterson taught himself CGI animation for the video. He had the idea for a snake for a year previously, and said that "it was quite daunting having to make it a reality learning how to use 3D animation software on the hoof". The video contains two dancers, Rhys Dennis and Kandaka Moore, who – over the course of two hours – were painted gold (using stop-frame animation, the whole process takes about 25 seconds) and then went into central London.

Critical reception
Critical reception was mixed. MTVIggy.com said that the song was "a funky hodgepodge of elements from the soul-sangin’ vocalists, calypso-flecked xylophone chimes and sharp snare drum beats". Joe Zadeh from Clash magazine called it "a throwaway ode to UK funky".

Track listing

Charts

References

2012 songs
2012 debut singles
Clean Bandit songs
Songs written by Grace Chatto
Songs written by Jack Patterson (Clean Bandit)
Black Butter Records singles